"Forever Now" is a song performed by American singer-songwriter Ne-Yo, taken from his fifth studio album, R.E.D. (2012). It was released on November 23, 2012 by Motown Records as the second international single and fourth overall single from the album. Ne-Yo co-wrote the song with its producers, StarGate, Bingo Players, Phatboiz.

Ne-Yo first performed "Forever Now" on The X Factor Germany on November 25, 2012. The music video was filmed in October 2012 by director Ryan Pallotta and was released on November 30, 2012.

Track listing

Chart performance

Weekly charts

Year-end charts

Release history

References

2012 singles
2012 songs
Ne-Yo songs
Motown singles
Songs written by Tor Erik Hermansen
Songs written by Mikkel Storleer Eriksen
Song recordings produced by Stargate (record producers)
Songs written by Maarten Hoogstraten
Songs written by Paul Bäumer (musician)
Songs written by Ne-Yo
Torch songs
Songs about loneliness